Tân Phú is a township and capital of Đồng Phú District, Bình Phước Province, Vietnam.

References

Populated places in Bình Phước province
District capitals in Vietnam
Townships in Vietnam